The Coates Golf Championship was a women's professional golf tournament on the LPGA Tour. It debuted as the first event in 2015 and was played at Golden Ocala Golf Club, west of Ocala, Florida.  The event was not included for the 2017 season.

Choi Na-yeon won the inaugural tournament by one stroke over Jang Ha-na, Lydia Ko, and Jessica Korda. With the runner-up finish, Ko moved to number one in the Women's World Golf Rankings.

Winners

Tournament records

References

External links

Coverage on the LPGA Tour's official site
Golden Ocala Golf & Equestrian Club: Golf

Former LPGA Tour events
Golf in Florida
Women's sports in Florida
Ocala, Florida
Recurring sporting events established in 2015
Recurring sporting events disestablished in 2016
2015 establishments in Florida
2016 disestablishments in Florida